Nathaniel Silsbee Jr. (December 28, 1804 – July 9, 1881) was a Massachusetts businessman and politician who served as a member of the Massachusetts House of Representatives, and twice as the Mayor of Salem, Massachusetts, and was for many years the treasurer of Harvard.

Early life
Silsbee was born on December 28, 1804, to former U.S. Senator Nathaniel Silsbee and Mary (Crowninshield) Silsbee.

Family life
Silsbee married Ann Cabot Devereux on November 9, 1829, in Salem, Essex Co., Mass. She was born Feb. 6, 1812 in Salem.

References

1804 births
1881 deaths
Members of the Massachusetts House of Representatives
Harvard University alumni
Massachusetts city council members
Mayors of Salem, Massachusetts
19th-century American politicians